The Cupcake Girls is a Canadian reality television series, which premiered on W Network in 2010. The series centres on Heather White and Lori Joyce, two women who are partners in a cupcake business in Vancouver, British Columbia.

The series aired for three seasons, concluding in 2012.

The series won the Gemini Award for Best Reality Series at the 25th Gemini Awards.

References

External links

2010s Canadian reality television series
2010 Canadian television series debuts
2012 Canadian television series endings
Television series by Force Four Entertainment
Gemini and Canadian Screen Award for Best Reality Series winners
W Network original programming